Vexillum adamsi is a species of sea snail, a marine gastropod mollusk, in the family Costellariidae, the ribbed miters.

Distribution
This marine species occurs off Hawaii.

References

External links
 Dohrn, H. (1861). Descriptions of new shells from the collection of H. Cuming, Esq. Proceedings of the Zoological Society of London. 1861: 205-207, pl. 26

adamsi
Gastropods described in 1861